competed in the Junior Eurovision Song Contest 2022 in Armenia, which was held on 11 December 2022 in Yerevan. The country was represented by Zlata Dziunka with the song "Nezlamna (Unbreakable)", who won the national selection organised by the Ukrainian broadcaster Suspilne.

Background 

In the  contest, Olena Usenko represented the country in Paris, France with the song the "Vazhil", placing 6th out of 19 entries with 125 points.

Before Junior Eurovision

National final 
The Ukrainian broadcaster announced on 1 August 2022 that they would be participating at the 2022 contest.

Format 
The final, which took place on 18 September 2022, featured five acts vying to represent Ukraine in Yerevan. The winner was selected via the 50/50 combination of votes from an online vote and an expert jury, the members of which were chosen by the public. The online voting, taking place via Suspilne's official website junioreurovision.ua, was opened on 16 September and closed before the show, and was reopened for 15 minutes after all songs were performed.  Both the public televote and the expert jury will assign scores ranging from 1 (lowest) to 5 (highest) and the entry that has the highest number of points following the combination of these scores is declared the winner. In the event of a tie, the jurors were to be tasked with assessing and individually voting for their favourite. The voting for the expert jury was organised via Suspilne's official website junioreurovision.ua. Ten candidates were presented to the public and a voting was open from 30 August to 6 September 2022, with the three candidates topping the online voting being invited to become jurors of the show. All candidates to become expert jurors were:

 Anzhelika Rudnytska – singer, television presenter, Merited Artist of Ukraine
 Darina Krasnovetska – Ukrainian representative in the Junior Eurovision Song Contest 2018
 Khrystyna Soloviy – folk singer-songwriter
 Krutь – singer, bandur player, composer, finalist of Vidbir 2020
 Mykhailo Klymenko – singer-songwriter
 Myroslava Saliy – co-founder of the children's folklore studio "Pravitsa"
 Serhiy Keyn – music journalist, publicist, artist, brand consultant
 Sophia Ivanko – Ukrainian representative in the Junior Eurovision Song Contest 2019
 Tonya Matvienko – singer, Merited Artist of Ukraine
 Vlad Darwin – singer-songwriter

The three selected jury members with the most votes were announced on 13 September 2022. Khrystyna Soloviy was chosen as the head juror, forming the jury panel together with Myroslava Saliy and Anzhelika Rudnytska.

Competing entries 
The submissions for the national selection with original songs from Ukrainian citizens or Ukrainians living in other countries were accepted until 23 August 2022, with participants being required to submit a live performance of their entries recorded on a laptop or telephone without any alterations made to the recording. Five acts were selected from over 50 received submissions to proceed to the final, which were announced on 6 September 2022.

Final 
The final took place on 18 September 2022, hosted by Timur Miroshnychenko in Kyiv and was broadcast on Suspilne Kultura as well as online via Suspilne's Facebook and YouTube channels. The results were determined by a combination of jury and online vote. Due to a tie in the final results, the jurors each voted individually for their winner, with Sofia Artemenko & DJ Polinka receiving 1 vote and Zlata Dziunka receiving 2 votes, therefore winning the final.

At Junior Eurovision 
After the opening ceremony, which took place on 5 December 2022, it was announced that Ukraine would perform sixteenth (last) on 11 December 2022, following Armenia.

Voting

Jury selection 
The members of the Ukrainian jury panel will be selected via a public online vote. Ten candidates were announced on 28 October 2022 and the online vote took place until 2 November 2022 via Suspilne's official website junioreurovision.ua. Based on the results of the vote, the five potential jurors that receive the most votes will be asked to sign to be part of the jury. In the event that a juror is unable to sign the agreement to be on the jury, the juror with the next highest number of votes will be offered the place on the jury.

 Adult jury

 Barleben
 Khayat
 MamaRika
 Victor Bayda
 Maksym Nagornyak
 Tatyana Piskaryova
 Sofia Rol
 Svetlana Tarabarova

 Kids' jury

 DJ Polinka
 Sofia Artemenko
 Anastasia Doroshenko
 Yelyzaveta Petruk
 Daria Rebrova
 Diana Stasiuk

Detailed voting results

References 

Ukraine
2022
Junior Eurovision Song Contest
Events affected by the 2022 Russian invasion of Ukraine